Snowbank Mountain is the highest point in the West Mountains, in Boise National Forest, Idaho with a summit elevation of  above sea level. The east side of Snowbank Mountain is drained by the North Fork Payette River, while the west side is drained by Squaw Creek, which is also a tributary of the Payette River.

References 

Mountains of Idaho
Mountains of Valley County, Idaho
Boise National Forest